Louis von Sonnenberg (19 May 1921 – 17 February 2004) was a Swiss sports shooter. He competed in the trap event at the 1960 Summer Olympics.

References

External links
 

1921 births
2004 deaths
People from Willisau District
Swiss male sport shooters
Olympic shooters of Switzerland
Shooters at the 1960 Summer Olympics
Sportspeople from the canton of Lucerne